{{Infobox settlement
| name                     = Bekasi
| official_name            = City of Bekasi{{nobold|Kota Bekasi}}
| translit_lang1           = Other
| translit_lang1_type2     = Sundanese
| translit_lang1_info2     = 
| translit_lang1_type1    = Chinese
| translit_lang1_info1    =   
| settlement_type          = City
| image_skyline            = 
| image_alt                = 
| image_caption            = From top, left to right:Patriot Candrabhaga Stadium, Pekayon City, Bekasi Junction Night, Commercial Centers, and Bekasi Mall at night
| image_flag               = Flag of Bekasi City.png
| image_shield             = Coat of arms of Bekasi.png
| nickname                 = Kota Patriot(City of the patriots)
| motto                    = Bekasi Maju, Sejahtera dan Ihsan (Indonesian)(For the Developed, Prosperous, and Good Bekasi people)
| image_map                = Map of West Java highlighting Bekasi City.svg
| mapsize                  = 
| map_caption              = Location within West Java
| pushpin_map              = Indonesia_Java#Indonesia
| pushpin_label_position   = right
| pushpin_map_caption      = Location in Java##Location in Indonesia
| coordinates              = 
| subdivision_type         = Country
| subdivision_name         = Indonesia
| subdivision_type1        = Province
| subdivision_name1        = West Java
| leader_title             = Acting Mayor
| leader_name              = Tri Adhianto Tjahyono
| leader_party             = 
| leader_title1            = Vice Mayor
| leader_name1             = 
| area_magnitude           = 
| area_total_km2           = 210.49
| area_total_sq_mi         = 
| area_land_km2            = 
| area_land_sq_mi          = 
| area_water_km2           = 
| area_water_sq_mi         = 
| area_water_percent       = 
| area_urban_km2           = 
| area_urban_sq_mi         = 
| area_metro_km2           = 
| area_metro_sq_mi         = 
| elevation_m              = 11–81
| elevation_ft             = 36–265
| population_total         = 2,564,940
| population_as_of         = mid 2021 official estimate
| population_density_km2   = 12,186
| population_density_sq_mi = 
| population_urban         = 
| population_density_urban_km2 = 
| population_metro         = 
| population_density_metro_km2 = 
| population_density_metro_sq_mi = 
| population_note          = 
| postal_code_type         = ZIP Code
| postal_code              = 
| area_code_type           = Area code
| area_code                = (+62) 21
| blank_name_sec1          = Vehicle registration
| blank_info_sec1          = B
| website                  = 
| footnotes                = 
| pushpin_label            = Bekasi City
| population_density_urban_mi2 = 
| timezone                 = Indonesia Western Time
| utc_offset               = +7
| timezone_DST             = 
| utc_offset_DST           = 
}}

Bekasi is a city in West Java, Indonesia, located on the eastern border of Jakarta. It serves as a commuter city within the Jakarta metropolitan area. According to the 2020 Census by Statistics Indonesia (BPS), Bekasi had 2,543,676 inhabitants. The official estimate for mid 2021 was 2,564,940. It lies within the largest metropolitan area in Indonesia (Jabodetabek). The city is bordered by Bekasi Regency to the north and the east, Bogor Regency and Depok to the south, and East Jakarta to the west.

Bekasi is one of the oldest cities in Indonesia, and has a history of being the capital city of the Kingdom of Tarumanagara. At that time, the name of Bekasi was Dayeuh Sundasembawa or Jayagiri. The earliest evidence of its existence dates from the fifth century according to the Tugu inscription, which describes the name of two rivers that run through the city, i.e. Candrabhaga and Gomati and one of those rivers, i.e. Candrabhaga is the origin of the name Bekasi where the name Candrabhaga evolved into Bhagasasi due to the Sanskrit word candra which means moon evolved into Old Sundanese word 'sasi' which also means moon and then the name Bhagasasi was misspelled as Bhagasi and then Dutch colonial government also misspelled the name Bhagasi as Bacassie and finally it became Bekasi. During the Dutch East Indies period, Bekasi was a part of Batavia residency. As a dormitory city, many middle class satellite areas have been developed in Bekasi, complete with their own shopping malls, schools, hospitals, club houses, water park, and shuttle bus services to central Jakarta. The large number of multinational companies has apparently attracted many expatriates (mainly Japanese and Korean) to settle in Bekasi.

Economy
Bekasi has already grown to become one of the centre of growth in Jabodetabek. The city accounts for 2.11% of total national GDP. Recently, many foreigners (mostly Korean, Japanese, and Chinese) have set up their business to take advantage of its dynamism and boost its economy. Bekasi's economy was mainly based on service and manufacturing.

Commerce
Bekasi is one of the most promising property markets in Jabodetabek besides South Tangerang, and several high-value developments have transformed its property market. Many of country's big property developers are building apartments, hotels, and shopping malls in the city. In recent years, some residences have developed along the Jatiwarna/Jatibening — East Bekasi toll highway, further to Cibatu in Bekasi Regency. These include Kota Harapan Indah, Summarecon Bekasi, Kemang Pratama and Grand Galaxy City.

Prime business and commercial centres are situated in the western part of city. There are some financial centres, restaurants, and shopping centres along Jalan Ahmad Yani, Jalan Sudirman, Jalan K.H. Noer Alie, and Harapan Indah Boulevard.
Other shopping centres include Metropolitan Mall, Summarecon Mal Bekasi, Mal Ciputra Cibubur, Mega Bekasi Hypermall, Grand Galaxy Park, Grand Mall, Blu Plaza, BTC Mall, GP Mall, Bekasi Cyber Park, Plaza Pondok Gede, and Lagoon Avenue. Many hotels developed in Bekasi, such as Santika, Horison, Harris, Aston Imperial, Amaris, Amaroossa and Tune Hotel.

Infrastructure

The development of large scale residential areas and industrial parks in Bekasi has been induced by infrastructure development, especially roads, highways and railways.

Road and highway
Bekasi is connected by the Trans-Java Toll Road, the main road across Java. There are three expressways connections from the Jabodetabek urban area: the Jakarta–Cikampek Toll Road, which has three exits in Bekasi; the Jakarta Outer Ring Road, which provides access to Tangerang, Jakarta and Bogor; and the new Bekasi-Cawang-Kampung Melayu Toll Road. In 2019, Jakarta-Cikampek elevated toll road will operate to ease traffic on the current toll road between Cikunir and West Karawang with a total length of 36.4 kilometres. Owing to its location as a satellite city of Jakarta, heavy rush hour traffic jams have become common on the roads between East Jakarta and Bekasi.

Railway
The government is currently constructing a double track railway connecting Manggarai to Cikarang, which would be finished around 2020. Beside a double track railway, the government also building a 17.9 km light rail transit line connecting East Bekasi-Cawang-Dukuh Atas across Greater Jakarta.

Transport

At present, rapid transit in Bekasi across Greater Jakarta consists of a commuter rail KRL Commuterline and a bus rapid transit TransJakarta.

Bekasi Station also serves intercity trains to cities across Java.

TransJakarta and the Transjabodetabek premium serves commuters from Harapan Indah, Summarecon Bekasi, Bulak Kapal, and Jatiwarna, as well as the feeder buses from Kemang Pratama and Grand Galaxy City to Jakarta city center. The Trans Patriot operates a route within the city. Damri shuttle bus service is available from the Soekarno–Hatta International Airport to Kayuringin, Harapan Indah and Summarecon Bekasi. Taxis are widely available. The primary means of public transportation is by minibus, called angkot. They serve certain routes throughout the city.

The main bus terminal is Terminal Bekasi, located in East Bekasi. The other terminals are Pondok Gede, Harapan Indah and Kayuringin.

Demographics
The 2020 Census of Bekasi's population was 2,543,676. Bekasi is inhabited by many different ethnic groups, mostly Sundanese, Betawi and Javanese descent. Sundanese are the largest minority as well as other minorities include Minangkabau, Bataks, and Chinese.

Most citizens in Bekasi adhere to Islam. Other religions include Christianity (Roman Catholicism and Protestantism), Hinduism, Buddhism, and Confucianism.

Sport

Bekasi was the home base of the football team PCB Persipasi., with Patriot Chandrabhaga Stadium as the home stadium of the club.

Administrative Districts

Bekasi City is divided into twelve districts ('kecamatan'), listed below with their areas and their populations at the 2010 Census and the 2020 Census, together with the official estimates for mid 2021. The table also includes the number of urban villages (kelurahan) within the district, and its postal codes.

Climate
Bekasi has a tropical monsoon climate (Am) according to Köppen climate classification. (as of 2020)

In popular culture
 Chairil Anwar's poem Karawang-Bekasi (1948).
 Pramoedya Ananta Toer's novel Di Tepi Kali Bekasi'' (1951) is set mainly in Bekasi.

People from Bekasi
Notable people from Bekasi include:
 Adixi Lenzivio: football player
 Luitenant der Chinezen Khouw Tian Sek: landlord, patriarch of the Khouw family of Tamboen
 Shella Devi Aulia: badminton player
 S. K. Trimurti: government minister, Independence activist, writer and journalist
 Tutty Alawiyah: government minister and women's rights advocate
Gloria Emanuelle Widjaja: badminton player
Rinov Rivaldy: badminton player
Zanadin Fariz: football player
Arapenta Poerba: football player
Althaf Indie: football player
Syahwal Ginting: football player

References

External links

 
 Bekasi local government website 

 Rumah Minimalis Depok 

 
Populated places in West Java